The Tafwyl festival is an annual Welsh-language festival which takes place in Cardiff, Wales. It culminates with a two day open air festival, normally held in Cardiff Castle.

Background
The event was set up in 2006 and initially took place on a small scale outside the Mochyn Du pub near the city centre. Since 2012 it has been held at Cardiff Castle or in Bute Park, though in July 2017 it took place in Llandaff Fields in Pontcanna. It forms part of a series of summer festivals entitled Cardiff Festivals.

Tafwyl is now split into two events: Tafwyl Fair, the main event at the weekend, and Tafwyl Week, a 7 day fringe festival the week before. The main weekend event includes bars (selling amongst other things the specially brewed beer 'Cwrw Tafwyl') and street food outlets. The organisers describe Tafwyl Week as featuring "Welsh culture at its very finest".

The main festival is free to enter and in 2017 saw 38,000 visitors with a peak of over 8,000 in the grounds at any one time, compared to Cardiff Castle's maximum capacity of 5,000. In 2014 Tafwyl attracted 18,717 people.

Bands and performers appearing at the festival have included Bryn Fôn, Candelas, Elin Fflur, Geraint Jarman, Y Niwl, Meic Stevens, Sŵnami and Yws Gwynedd.

References

External links
Official English-language homepage
2017 evaluation report
Wales Online article

Festivals in Cardiff
Festivals established in 2006
Welsh language
Summer events in Wales